Vilim Herman (born 19 January 1949) is a Croatian jurist and politician. A former representative in the Croatian Parliament, he serves as a professor of law at the University of Osijek.

Early life
Herman was born in Osijek to a Jewish family. The first written records of his family date back to 1832, when his great-grandfather moved to Osijek from Warsaw, Poland. Herman's great-grandfather was a merchant who owned a trade business "S. Weiss & D. Herrmann" in Osijek district Donji grad. His father, Maks Herman, advised him to study law. Herman earned his degree from the University of Belgrade's Law School

Political career
Herman has been member of the Croatian Social Liberal Party since 1990. In the 2nd assembly of Sabor, Herman was elected to fill a minority quota as a Jewish representative, in the Croatian Social Liberal Party (HSLS) electoral list.

In the 4th assembly of Sabor, Herman was a member of the HSLS, and after that the Party of Liberal Democrats (LIBRA). In the 5th assembly of Sabor, he was a member of LIBRA, then of HNS-LD, and in 2005 he joined the Slavonia-Baranja Croatian Party.

References

1949 births
Living people
People from Osijek
Croatian Jews
Croatian people of Polish-Jewish descent
University of Belgrade Faculty of Law alumni
Croatian lawyers
Representatives in the modern Croatian Parliament
Croatian Social Liberal Party politicians
Jewish Croatian politicians
University of Osijek alumni
Academic staff of the University of Osijek
Party of Liberal Democrats politicians